Catherine Rosemary Martin  (born April 1955) is a Professor of Plant Sciences at the University of East Anglia and project leader at the John Innes Centre, Norwich, co-ordinating research into the relationship between diet and health and how crops can be fortified to improve diets and address escalating chronic disease globally.

Education
Martin received a First Class Honours degree in Natural Sciences from the University of Cambridge. She then went on to obtain her PhD in Biochemistry in 1981, also from Cambridge.

Research and career
Her research has included work on blood oranges, and purple, high anthocyanin tomatoes.

After a period as a postdoctoral research fellow at the University of Cambridge she moved to the John Innes Centre's Department of Genetics in 1983. She was the first to identify genes which regulated cell shape in plants.

Since 2000, Cathie's research has focused on diet and health, researching how crops can be fortified to combat chronic disease across the world. This research has focused on plants which contain natural chemical compounds, which can be seen as 'natural medicines'. Examples include work researching blood oranges, and high-anthocyanin purple tomatoes. In 2022 Martin's laboratory produced genetically manipulated tomatoes containing high levels of a precursor to vitamin D. These were scheduled for field trials, and intended to improve dietary intake of vitamin D.

With Liam Dolan, Alison Mary Smith, George Coupland, Nicholas Harberd, Jonathan Jones, Robert Sablowski and Abigail Amey she is a co-author of the textbook Plant Biology.

She was the editor-in-chief of The Plant Cell, and was the first woman and first non-American to hold this post. She holds seven patents and co-founded
the University spin-off company Norfolk Plant Sciences with Jonathan Jones, to bring the benefits of plant biotechnology to Europe and the United States.

Awards and honours
Martin was appointed MBE in the 2013 Birthday Honours for "services to plant biotechnology" and the Biotechnology and Biological Sciences Research Council (BBSRC) Most Promising Innovator 2014. Cathie's research into Purple Tomatoes gained her and Dr Eugenio Butelli BBSRC's Most Promising Innovator award in 2014. She has also been recognised by:

Society for Experimental Biology (SEB) President's Medal, 1990
 Awarded EMBO Membership in 2011
Fellowship from the American Association for the Advancement of Science, 2012
Member of the Order of the British Empire (MBE), 2013
BBSRC Most Promising Innovator, 2014
Made fellow of American Society of Plant Biologists 2017
 Elected a Fellow of the Royal Society (FRS) in 2018
Awarded the Rank Prize for Nutrition in 2021

References

1955 births
Living people
Alumni of the University of Cambridge
Academics of the University of East Anglia
British botanists
Fellows of the Royal Society
Female Fellows of the Royal Society
Members of the Order of the British Empire
Women botanists